Happy Hollow Heights Historic District is a national historic district located at West Lafayette, Tippecanoe County, Indiana.  The district encompasses 54 contributing buildings in a predominantly planned residential section of Lafayette, platted in 1953 and expanded in 1958.  It developed between about 1953 and 1967 and includes representative examples of Ranch, Modern, and Split-level style architecture.

It was listed on the National Register of Historic Places in 2015.

See also
Chauncey-Stadium Avenues Historic District
Hills and Dales Historic District

References

Neighborhoods in West Lafayette, Indiana
Historic districts on the National Register of Historic Places in Indiana
Modernist architecture in Indiana
Historic districts in West Lafayette, Indiana
National Register of Historic Places in Tippecanoe County, Indiana